Hexadactilia civilis is a moth of the family Pterophoridae. It is found in Queensland, Australia.

Original description

External links
Australian Faunal Directory
Trin Wiki

Moths of Australia
Deuterocopinae
Moths described in 1921